The 1988 United States House of Representatives elections was an election for the United States House of Representatives in November 8, 1988, to elect members to serve in the 101st United States Congress. They coincided with the election of George H. W. Bush as president.  Although Bush won with a strong majority, his Republican Party lost a net of two seats to the Democratic Party, slightly increasing the Democratic majority in the House. It was the first time since 1960 that an incoming president's party lost seats in the House.

As of 2021, this is the last congressional election in which Republicans won a House seat in Hawaii for a full term and the last time they won a seat in Vermont.

Overall results

Source: Election Statistics – Office of the Clerk

Special elections 

Ordered by election date, then by state/district.

Alabama

Alaska

Arizona

Arkansas

California

Colorado

Connecticut

Delaware

Florida

Georgia 

Source:

Hawaii

Idaho

Illinois

Indiana

Iowa

Kansas

Kentucky

Louisiana

Maine

Maryland

Massachusetts

Michigan

Minnesota

Mississippi

Missouri

Montana

Nebraska

Nevada

New Hampshire

New Jersey

New Mexico

New York

North Carolina

North Dakota

Ohio

Oklahoma

Oregon

Pennsylvania

Rhode Island

South Carolina

South Dakota

Tennessee

Texas

Utah

Vermont

Virginia

Washington

West Virginia

Wisconsin

Wyoming

See also
 1988 United States elections
 1988 United States gubernatorial elections
 1988 United States presidential election
 1988 United States Senate elections
 100th United States Congress
 101st United States Congress

External links
 Statistics of the Congressional Election of November 8, 1988, Office of the Clerk U.S. House of Representatives

References